The Jared L. Brush Barn, in rural Weld County, Colorado near Johnstown, Colorado, was built c.1865.  It was listed on the National Register of Historic Places in 1991.

It is a vernacular wood frame barn erected to store hay and grains by homesteader Jared Lamar Brush.

References

External links

Barns on the National Register of Historic Places in Colorado
National Register of Historic Places in Weld County, Colorado
Buildings and structures completed in 1865